Helmholtz most commonly refers to Hermann von Helmholtz (1821-1894), German physician and physicist.

Helmholtz or Helmholz may also refer to:

 Places named after the German physicist:
 Helmholtz (lunar crater)
 Helmholtz (Martian crater)
Helmholtz Association of German Research Centres
A. Carl Helmholz (1915-2003), an American nuclear physicist
Anna von Helmholtz (1834–1899), German salonnière, writer and translator
Lindsay Helmholz (1909-1993), an American chemist
 Helmholtz Watson, a character in Aldous Huxley's Brave New World
 Helmholtz equation, the eigenvalue problem for the Laplacian operator